Teochew Letters were a form of family correspondence combined with remittance, sent by Teochew immigrants in Southeast Asia (particularly Thailand, Singapore, Malaysia, Indonesia, Vietnam and Cambodia) as well as Hong Kong, to their families in the Teochew region (now known as Chaoshan in Mandarin), in eastern Guangdong Province, China.

These letters were sent from the early 19th century till the 20th century. They were initially delivered by men known as zui-kheh literally   "Water Traveller", who travelled frequently between Southeast Asia and the Teochew region for business. Towards the end of the 19th century, delivery of the Teochew Letters became a full-fledged industry, known as the Qiaopi industry. Qiaopi agencies in Southeast Asia collected the letters and remittances from the migrant workers and sent them to their corresponding partner in Swatow. The agencies in Swatow then distributed the letters to local agencies located in the counties and villages of the Teochew region. The men employed to hand-deliver the letters and money to the families were known as phoe-kha, literally the "Feet of the Letters". The Qiaopi industry ended in 1979 when the government in China ordered its functions to be transferred to Bank of China.

Family correspondence combined with remittance was not unique to the Teochews. Other groups of overseas Chinese, including the Hokkien, the Cantonese and the Hakka, also used this method to communicate with their families. The Qiaopi agencies of the different groups served only their own community circle and their services did not overlap. An estimate of 170,000 Qiaopi letters have been collected by researchers and private collectors. The majority are Teochew Letters. The Museum of Overseas Remittance Mail Relics, based in Swatow, has a collection of 120,000 Teochew Letters, consisting of both originals and copies.
The Teochew Letters has immense historical value. It is an archive of the cultural and collective historical experiences of the Teochew people. Its contents reflect society at all levels, touching on international relations, national issues, and details of daily life important to families. As such, the information they contain bear intrinsic value for further research, as they are able to authenticate and supplement contemporary written history.

Terms 
Qiaopi literally means the "Letter of the Overseas Chinese", with "phoe" being the Southern Min expression for "letter". The term has sometimes been translated as Overseas Remittance Mail or Money Remittance Mail but these fail to capture the cultural aspect of the artefacts.

Application for UNESCO Memory of the World Register 

As part of the larger Archive of Overseas Remittance Mails, the Teochew Letters were added to the China Archival Heritage Register in 2010. Together with the Qiaopi collection of Jiangmen, Meizhou and Fujian, the Teochew Letters were included into the Asia/Pacific Regional Memory of the World (MOW) Register on 16 May 2012. Higher recognition is being sought through ongoing submission for inclusion in the prestigious UNESCO Memory of the World Register in 2013.

To increase general awareness of the Teochew Letters and to promote the UNESCO Memory of the World Register application efforts, The Museum of Overseas Remittance Mail Relics launched an online museum for the Teochew Letters in June 2012. The website was created on behalf of the museum by the Cheung Kong School of Journalism of Shantou University.

References 

19th-century documents
20th-century documents
Letters (message)
Teochew culture